One Touch of Sin is a 1917 American silent drama film directed by Richard Stanton and starring Gladys Brockwell, Jack Standing and Willard Louis.

Cast
 Gladys Brockwell as Mary Livingston 
 Jack Standing as Richard Mallaby 
 Willard Louis as Watt Tabor 
 Sedley Brown as Old Livingston 
 Carrie Clark Ward as The Widow 
 Frankie Lee as Little Billy 
 Charles Edler as Rd 
 Jack McDonald as Hard-luck Danver

References

Bibliography
 Solomon, Aubrey. The Fox Film Corporation, 1915-1935: A History and Filmography. McFarland, 2011.

External links
 

1917 films
1917 drama films
1910s English-language films
American silent feature films
Silent American drama films
American black-and-white films
Films directed by Richard Stanton
Fox Film films
1910s American films